The Khmer Occupational Citizenship and Transportation Association (KOCTA) is a trade union of informal economy workers in Cambodia. The union was established in 2008 and claims to represent 575 members in nine branches. KOCTA is not affiliated with any trade union federation.

References

Trade unions in Cambodia
2008 establishments in Cambodia
Trade unions established in 2008
Labour relations in Cambodia